Gradient echo is a magnetic resonance imaging (MRI) sequence that has wide variety of applications, from magnetic resonance angiography to perfusion MRI and diffusion MRI. Rapid imaging acquisition allows it to be applied to 2D and 3D MRI imaging. Gradient echo uses magnetic gradients to generate a signal, instead of using 180 degrees radiofrequency pulse like spin echo; thus leading to faster image acquisition time.

Steady-state free precession

Steady-state free precession imaging (SSFP) or balanced SSFP is an MRI technique which uses short repetition times (TR) and low flip angles (about 10 degrees) to achieve steady state of longitudinal magnetizations as the magnetizations does not decay completely nor achieving full T1 relaxation. While spoiled gradient-echo sequences refer to a steady state of the longitudinal magnetization only, SSFP gradient-echo sequences include transverse coherences (magnetizations) from overlapping multi-order spin echoes and stimulated echoes. This is usually accomplished by refocusing the phase-encoding gradient in each repetition interval in order to keep the phase integral (or gradient moment) constant. Fully balanced SSFP MRI sequences achieve a phase of zero by refocusing all imaging gradients.

New methods and variants of existing methods are often published when they are able to produce better results in specific fields. Examples of these recent improvements are T-weighted turbo spin-echo (T2 TSE MRI), double inversion recovery MRI (DIR-MRI) or phase-sensitive inversion recovery MRI (PSIR-MRI), all of them able to improve imaging of brain lesions. Another example is MP-RAGE (magnetization-prepared rapid acquisition with gradient echo), which improves images of multiple sclerosis cortical lesions.

Spoiling
At the end of the reading, the residual transverse magnetization can be terminated (through the application of suitable gradients and the excitation through pulses with a variable phase radiofrequency) or maintained.

In the first case there is a spoiled sequence, such as the fast low-angle shot MRI (FLASH MRI) sequence, while in the second case there are steady-state free precession imaging (SSFP) sequences.

In-phase and out-of-phase
In-phase (IP) and out-of-phase (OOP) sequences correspond to paired gradient echo sequences using the same repetition time (TR) but with two different echo times (TE). This can detect even microscopic amounts of fat, which has a drop in signal on OOP compared to IP. Among renal tumors that do not show macroscopic fat, such a signal drop is seen in 80% of the clear cell type of renal cell carcinoma as well as in minimal fat angiomyolipoma.

Effective T2 (T2* or "T2-star")

T2*-weighted imaging can be created as a postexcitation refocused gradient echo sequence with small flip angle. The sequence of a GRE T2*WI requires high uniformity of the magnetic field.

Commercial names of gradient echo sequences

VIBE (volumetric interpolated breath-hold examination) is an MRI sequence that produces T1-weighted gradient echo images in three-dimensions (3D). Apart from lower fluid signal intensity than a typical T1-weighted image, other appearances of VIBE images is similar to a typical T1-weighted image. Since its acquisition is only 30 seconds, suitable for breath-holding, it is used in breast and abdominal imaging to obtain high-resolution images minimising respiratory movement artifacts. VIBE images have low contrast in soft tissues and cartilage but have high contrast between the bony cortex and bone marrow. Bony lesions such as callus and fibrous tissue can also be readily distinguished from surrounding cortical bone because high contrast between the bone lesions and the bony cortex.

References

Magnetic resonance imaging
Nuclear magnetic resonance
Quantum mechanics